CJK Unified Ideographs 08D00-09FFF